Celle Ligure is a comune (municipality) in the Province of Savona in the Italian region Liguria, located about  west of Genoa and about  northeast of Savona.

It borders the comuni of: Albisola Superiore, Stella, and Varazze.

Main sights
Parish church of San Michele Arcangelo (1645). It houses a polyptych by Perin del Vaga from 1535
Pseudo-Romanesque church of Nostra Signora della Consolazione (18th century)
Bregalla Tower (11th through 16th centuries)

International relations

Celle Ligure is twinned with:
Celle, Germany

People 

Francesco della Rovere, later Pope Sixtus IV, was born in Celle in 1414.

References

External links
 Official website
 Travel Guide
 Webcam of the Beach
 Photos of Celle Ligure

Cities and towns in Liguria